Kin Kiesse is a 1982 documentary film about "Kin" (Kinshasa), the capital of Zaire, and the capital of paradoxes and excesses, commentated on by one of its naïf artists, the painter Chéri Samba. We discover the "Kin" of night clubs, high-rise buildings, bicycle-taxis, shoe shiners and hairdressers, the "Kin" of poor neighborhoods, but, above all, the "Kin" of music, where all the genres rub elbows, from beer party brass bands to the rumba to traditional dances, without leaving out the in-fashion bands of the time.

According to the film's director, Mwezé Ngangura, Chéri Samba was instrumental in the making of the film, convincing the French Ministry of Co-operation, France 2 and Congolese television that Ngangura could make a film on Kinshasa.

Awards 
 Fespaco 1983

References 

1982 films
Creative Commons-licensed documentary films
Democratic Republic of the Congo short documentary films
1982 documentary films
1982 short films
1980s short documentary films
Kinshasa
Films shot in the Democratic Republic of the Congo
Documentary films about cities
Documentary films about African music
1980s French-language films
Films directed by Mwezé Ngangura